Happy to Be... is a studio album by Greek singer Demis Roussos, released in 1976 on Philips Records.

Commercial performance 
The album reached no. 4 in the UK and no. 23 in Sweden.

Track listing

Charts

Weekly charts

Year-end charts

Certifications

References

External links 
 Demis Roussos – Happy to Be... at Discogs
 Demis Roussos – Happy To Be... (Vinyl, LP, Album) at Discogs

1976 albums
Demis Roussos albums
Philips Records albums